The Nagtahan Link Bridge is a series of road bridges crossing the Pasig River between the districts of Paco and Santa Mesa in Manila, Philippines. Constructed from 1996 to 1998, the road links and bridges pass along the Paco-Santa Mesa Road, which is also referred to as Tomas Claudio Street.

Link Bridge 1 
Nagtahan Link Bridge 1 is a  elevated one-way road flyover located in Paco and Pandacan. The flyover was constructed in 1998 and serves as the eastbound side of Tomas Claudio Street from Quirino Avenue, crossing over the Philippine National Railways and the streets of Beata, Menandro, Dr. M.L. Carreon, and Kahilum II before it descends near the San Miguel Yamamura packaging plant.

The road, known as Nagtahan Link Road 1, becomes one-way eastbound again as it meets with the start of the one-way westbound Nagtahan Link Bridge 4. The combined four-lane road continues east as Nagtahan Link Bridge 3. Prior to the construction of the Skyway Stage 3, the road and flyover has since become two-way.

Link Bridge 3 

Nagtahan Link Bridge 3, also known as Santa Mesa Bridge, Padre Jacinto Zamora Bridge, and Pandacan Bridge is a  two-way four lane (two lane per direction) bridge that crosses the Pasig River and connects the districts of Pandacan and Santa Mesa. The road then terminates at an intersection with Valenzuela Street, which provides access to Victorino Mapa Street, Magsaysay Boulevard and P. Sanchez Road. It was constructed in 1998 and renamed in 2000 after martyred priest Jacinto Zamora, who was born in Pandacan.

This bridge is parallel to the Pandacan Railway Bridge, a steel railway bridge used by the PNR Metro Commuter Line, and an aqueduct held by Maynilad.

Link Bridge 4 

Nagtahan Link Bridge 4, also known as Tomas Claudio Bridge, is a  elevated flyover located in Pandacan. The flyover was constructed in 1998 and serves as the westbound side of Tomas Claudio Street from the end of Padre Jacinto Zamora Bridge (Link Bridge 3) and crosses over the Beata Street, and Pandacan station of the PNR Metro Commuter Line until it terminates at an intersection with Menandro, Laura, and Dr. M. L. Carreon Streets, where it continues westbound to Nagtahan Link Bridge 5.

The westbound section is officially named Nagtahan Link Road 2. The entire road and bridge were closed during the construction of Skyway Stage 3 beginning in 2019.

Link Bridge 5 
Nagtahan Link Bridge 5 is a short  road bridge carrying the westbound side of Tomas Claudio Street over the Estero de Pandacan (which becomes the Beata Creek) bordering the districts of Pandacan and Paco. It currently does not provide westbound motorists access to Paco as it leads to the street's westbound section that has been closed since the construction of Skyway Stage 3, thus allowing on-street parking on the westbound section from the bridge to Dr. M. L. Carreon Street.

Intersections

References 

Bridges in Manila
Buildings and structures in Paco, Manila
Buildings and structures in Santa Mesa
Bridges completed in 1998